Rola is a given name, nickname and surname. Notable people that are known by this name include the following:

Mononym
 Rola (model) stagename of Eri Sato (born 1990), Japanese fashion model of Bangladeshi descent

Nickname
 Rola Chen, stagename of Chen Yi (born 1987), Chinese model and actress who works in Japan

Given name
 Rola Bahnam, Lebanese TV presenter of an Iraqi descent
 Rola Dashti (born 1964), Kuwaiti economist, business executive, politician and minister
 Rola El-Halabi (born 1985), professional German boxer of Lebanese origin
 Rola El Haress (born 1983), Lebanese swimmer
 Rola Hallam, British-Syrian consultant anaesthetist, humanitarian, international advocate and speaker
 Rola Khaled (born 1984), Lebanese Muay Thai practitioner
 Rola Nashef (fl. 2012–present), American director, screenwriter, producer and multimedia artist
 Rola Saad (born 1978), Lebanese pop singer and model
 Rola Saad (producer) (born 1948), Lebanese pan-Arab television personality
 Rola Sleiman (born 1975), Lebanese-Syrian female pastor
 Rola Tabash (fl. 2018-2022), Lebanese politician

Surname
 Balthasar Klossowski de Rola, known as Balthus (1908 – 2001), Polish-French modern artist
 Anisa Rola (born 1994), Slovenian football defender
 Blaž Rola (born 1990), Slovenian tennis player
 Michał Rola-Żymierski (1890 – 1989), Polish Communist leader
 Stanisław Rola (born 1957), Polish race walker

See also

Lola (given name)
Rola (disambiguation)
Rolo (name)
Rora (name)

Lebanese feminine given names